Rodney Ascher is an American film director, best known for his 2012 documentary Room 237.

Early life
His mother is Jewish, and he resides in Hollywood.

Awards
Best Director Award at the Austin Fantastic Fest (2012, won for Room 237)
Best Editing Award from the International Documentary Association (2012, won for Room 237)

Filmography

Fiction
Hot Chicks (2006, segment "Somebody Goofed")
The ABCs of Death 2 (2014, segment "Q is for Questionnaire")
Director's Commentary: Terror of Frankenstein (2015)

Non-fiction
Room 237 (2012)
The Nightmare (2015)
The El Duce Tapes (2019)
A Glitch in the Matrix (2021)

Short films
Alfred (1997)
Triumph of Victory (2001)
Shirts & Skins (2008)
Visions of Terror (2008)
Dog Days (2009)
The Lonely Death of the Giggler (2010)
The S from Hell (2010, documentary short)
Primal Screen (2016, documentary short)

Television
Bridal Shop (2007, 7 episodes)
UCB Comedy Originals (2008, 1 episode - "Man Boobs")
The Very Funny Show (2007, 6 episodes)

References

External links
 
 

Living people
American documentary film directors
Year of birth missing (living people)